Matsugae Dam is a gravity dam located in Fukuoka Prefecture in Japan. The dam is used for water supply. The catchment area of the dam is 2.8 km2. The dam impounds about 10  ha of land when full and can store 1579 thousand cubic meters of water. The construction of the dam was started on 1957 and completed in 1960.

References

Dams in Fukuoka Prefecture
1960 establishments in Japan